Gastão Elias was the defending champion but chose not to defend his title.

João Domingues won the title after defeating Sebastian Ofner 7–6(7–4), 6–4 in the final.

Seeds

Draw

Finals

Top half

Bottom half

References
Main Draw
Qualifying Draw

Venice Challenge Save Cup - Singles
XV Singles